Louis Vincent Goulven Salou (23 April 1902 – 12 October 1948) was a French stage and film actor.

Louis was born in Oissel and died in Fontenay-aux-Roses.

Selected filmography
 First Ball (1941)
 The Benefactor (1942)
 Bolero (1942)
 Voyage Without Hope (1943)
 The Wolf of the Malveneurs (1943)
 Mademoiselle Béatrice (1943)
 Traveling Light (1944)
 Father Serge (1945)
Farandole (1945)
 Boule de suif (1945)
 Children of Paradise (1945)
 Devil and the Angel (1946)
 Roger la Honte (1946)
 The Revenge of Roger (1946)
 Sylvie and the Ghost (1946)
 Goodbye Darling (1946)
 Counter Investigation (1947)
 The Sharks of Gibraltar (1947)
 Eternal Conflict (1948)
 The Charterhouse of Parma (1948)
 Fabiola (1949)
 The Lovers of Verona (1949)

External links

1902 births
1948 deaths
French male stage actors
French male film actors
People from Quimper
20th-century French male actors
1948 suicides
Suicides by poison
Suicides in France